Cyperus remotispicatus is a species of sedge that is native to western parts of tropical Africa.

See also 
 List of Cyperus species

References 

remotispicatus
Plants described in 1972
Flora of Burkina Faso
Flora of Gabon
Flora of Ghana
Flora of Guinea-Bissau
Flora of Ivory Coast
Flora of Nigeria
Flora of Senegal
Taxa named by Sheila Spenser Hooper